Assam Baptist Convention (ABC) is a Baptist Christian denomination based in Assam, India, with more than 37,000 members and 300 congregations.

History
The Assam Baptist Convention traces its origins back to the work of 19th Century Baptists missionaries in Assam such as Krishna Chandra Pal, Nathan Brown, Oliver Cutter and Miles Bronson.  The first indigenous person from Assam to be baptized into the baptist faith was Nidhi Levi from the aboriginal Kaibarta(JalKeot) ethnicity baptized in 1841.  The Baptist Church of Assam was formed in 1845 with its headquarters at Guwahati.  There was a small revival in Nidhi in 1847, but as of 1861 the Assam Baptist Church had only 31 members.

The Assam Baptist Convention currently operates a school in Nagaon and another in Golaghat.

See also 
 Council of Baptist Churches in Northeast India
 North East India Christian Council
 List of Christian denominations in North East India

Sources

Christianity in Assam
Religious organizations established in 1845
Baptist denominations in India
1845 establishments in British India